is a Japanese professional golfer.

Igarashi was born in Saitama Prefecture. He currently plays on the Japan Golf Tour where he has won once in 2009 at the UBS Japan Golf Tour Championship ShishidoHills.

Professional wins (1)

Japan Golf Tour wins (1)

Japan Golf Tour playoff record (0–1)

Results in World Golf Championships

External links

Japanese male golfers
Japan Golf Tour golfers
Sportspeople from Saitama Prefecture
1968 births
Living people